Psenulus is a genus of wasps in the family Crabronidae. The 160 species are found worldwide, but are best represented in the Indomalayan realm with 68. The Palearctic has 26, the Nearctic 4, and the Australasian realm 3. Psenulus is largely absent from South America (1 species) and entirely absent from Melanesia and Polynesia. A recent phylogenetic analysis provided strong evidence that this genus is the closest living relative to bees.

Species (Europa)  
Psenulus berlandi Beaumont 1937
Psenulus concolor (Dahlbom 1843)
Psenulus cypriacus van Lith 1973
Psenulus fulvicornis (Schenck 1857)
Psenulus fuscipennis (Dahlbom 1843)
Psenulus hidalgo Guichard 1990
Psenulus laevigatus (Schenck 1857)
Psenulus meridionalis Beaumont 1937
Psenulus pallipes (Panzer 1798)
Psenulus schencki (Tournier 1889)

References

External links 
 Psenulus images at  Consortium for the Barcode of Life
  Catalog of Sphecidae California Academy of Sciences Institute of Biodiversity

Crabronidae
Apoidea genera